The Ministry of Justice (MJ;) is the government department of East Timor accountable for the administration of justice.

Functions
The Ministry is responsible for the design, implementation, coordination and evaluation of policy for the following areas:

 justice;
 law and human rights;and
 land and property.

In 2011, the Ministry established a protocol with the East Timor Bar Association in order to ensure the proper training of lawyers.

Minister

See also 
 List of justice ministries
 Politics of East Timor

References

Footnote

Notes

External links

  – official site  

Justice
East Timor
East Timor, Justice
1975 establishments in East Timor